Ying Baoshi was the circuit intendant ("tao tai") of Shanghai from 1865 to 1868.

Legacy
His treatise "The Seven Nos" was influential in limiting rail construction in China in the late 19th century.

See also
 History of rail transport in China

Notes

References

Politicians from Jinhua
Qing dynasty politicians from Zhejiang